Dera Ismail Khan Cantonment is a cantonment adjacent to the Dera Ismail Khan, which is situated in Khyber Pakhtunkhwa, Pakistan.

References

More information at: http://www.globalsecurity.org/military/world/pakistan/cantt-dera-ismail-khan.htm

Dera Ismail Khan District
Cantonments of Pakistan